Tripper's Day is a British television sitcom produced by Thames Television for ITV. The plot centres on Leonard Rossiter as Norman Tripper, a northern manager assigned to a London supermarket with problematic staff. The programme received poor reviews and was Rossiter's final television work; the actor died between the broadcast of the second and third episodes.

The series was brought back two years later with Bruce Forsyth in the lead role, under the new title Slinger's Day. In Canada and United States the series had a remake under the title Check it Out! (1985–1988). In Sweden, comical duo Stefan & Krister starred in Full Frys, a TV series largely based on Tripper's Day and Check it Out!. The last 2 episodes were transmitted on the original dates only in the London area due to strike action at Thames Television which stopped them from being networked

Episodes

Home release
The complete series of Tripper's Day was released on DVD on 20 September 2010.

References

External links

 Tripper's Day at Leonard Rossiter.com
 
 

1984 British television series debuts
1984 British television series endings
1980s British sitcoms
1980s British workplace comedy television series
English-language television shows
ITV sitcoms
Television shows produced by Thames Television
Television series by Fremantle (company)
Television series set in shops
Television shows set in London
Television shows shot at Teddington Studios